Marc Savard (born July 17, 1977) is a Canadian former professional ice hockey centre and current head coach of the Windsor Spitfires of the Ontario Hockey League (OHL). He played in the National Hockey League (NHL) for the New York Rangers (who originally drafted him in 1995), Calgary Flames, Atlanta Thrashers and Boston Bruins. He was an assistant coach for the St. Louis Blues during the 2019–20 season.

Savard's career ended late in the 2010–11 season due to post-concussion syndrome. He did not formally announce his retirement until the conclusion of his contract with Boston after the 2016–17 season.

Playing career

Early career (1993–1999)
Savard played major junior hockey in the Ontario Hockey League (OHL) with the Oshawa Generals, beginning in 1993–94. After his second season with the Generals, in which he scored a league-leading 139 points, he was selected 91st overall in the 1995 NHL Entry Draft by the New York Rangers. He continued to play in the OHL for two more seasons and earned his second Eddie Powers Memorial Trophy as the OHL's leading scorer with 130 points in 1996–97. Savard then added 27 points in 15 playoff games, guiding the Generals to the 1997 J. Ross Robertson Cup and an appearance in the 1997 Memorial Cup.

In 1997–98, Savard was assigned by the Rangers to their American Hockey League (AHL) affiliate, the Hartford Wolfpack. He scored 74 points with Hartford while being called up to play in 28 games for the Rangers in his rookie professional campaign. The following season, he earned an expanded role with the Rangers and scored 45 points in 70 games.

Calgary Flames (1999–2002)
On June 26, 1999, shortly after the completion of Savard's first full season with the Rangers, he was traded to the Calgary Flames, along with the Rangers' first-round choice in 1999 (Oleg Saprykin), in exchange for the playing rights to Jan Hlaváč, Calgary's first-round pick (Jamie Lundmark) and third-round pick (later traded back to Calgary; Calgary selected Craig Anderson) in the 1999 Draft. Savard continued to improve with the Flames and in 2000–01, he finished second in team scoring to Jarome Iginla with 65 points.

Atlanta Thrashers (2002–2006)
Shortly after beginning his fourth season with the Flames, Savard was acquired by the Atlanta Thrashers from Calgary in exchange for Ruslan Zainullin on November 15, 2002. Playing with superstar wingers Dany Heatley and Ilya Kovalchuk, Savard became a point-per-game player and recorded 52 points in 45 games during an injury shortened 2003–04 season.

Due to the 2004–05 NHL lockout, Savard played in the Swiss leagues with HC Thurgau of Nationalliga B and briefly with SC Bern of Nationalliga A. When NHL play resumed the following season, he emerged as a top talent in the NHL with a career-high 97 points, good for ninth overall in the league.

Boston Bruins (2006–2011)

At the end of his breakthrough season, Savard became an unrestricted free agent and signed with the Boston Bruins to a four-year, $20 million contract on July 1, 2006. He picked up where he left off in Atlanta and led the Bruins in scoring in his first season with the team, tallying 96 points. His 74 assists were good for third in the league for the second consecutive season, behind Joe Thornton (92) and Sidney Crosby (84).

In his second season with the Bruins, Savard was named to his first NHL All-Star Game in 2008, replacing an injured Dany Heatley. He scored the game-winning goal with 21 seconds remaining in the third period. Although Savard's offensive production was cut down to 78 points because of injury in the 2007–08 season, he made his Stanley Cup playoffs debut after 11 seasons in the NHL. As the Bruins faced the Montreal Canadiens in the opening round, Savard scored his first NHL playoff goal in the first overtime of Game 3. He scored six points in the series, but the Bruins were eliminated by the Canadiens in seven games.

Savard was named as a reserve to his second All-Star Game in Montreal the following season, in 2008–09, and helped lead the Bruins to a first-place finish in the Eastern Conference. Savard led the Bruins in scoring with 88 points in 82 games before adding 13 points in 11 playoff games. Playing the Canadiens in the first round for the second consecutive year, Savard and the Bruins swept the series in four games. He advanced to the second round for the first time in his career, where the Bruins were eliminated in seven games by the Carolina Hurricanes.

Seven games into the 2009–10 season, Savard sustained a broken foot while inadvertently blocking a shot. After he was taken to Massachusetts General Hospital, tests revealed he had been playing with an injured foot since taking a previous shot in the foot during training camp. Savard was placed on the long-term injured reserve on October 21, 2009. Shortly after returning to the line-up, the Bruins signed Savard to a seven-year extension on December 1, worth $28.05 million (approximately $4.2 million per season). The contract is spread out, with approximately $14 million the first two years and $14 million for the remaining five.

On January 7, 2010, only 28 seconds into his first shift on the ice, Marc Savard suffered a right knee injury after colliding with Jonathan Toews from the Chicago Blackhawks. After getting an MRI, he was placed on injured reserve with a minor MCL tear in his right knee. No surgery was required.

Concussion
On March 7, 2010, Savard suffered a Grade 2 concussion in the third period of the Bruins' game against the Pittsburgh Penguins after getting a shoulder to the head from Matt Cooke. The on-ice officials did not penalize Cooke for the hit, and on March 10, Colin Campbell declared that the NHL would not suspend or fine Cooke. The hit and its aftermath were part of the key evidence that caused NHL to institute a new rule that more heavily penalized blindside hits. Savard was not taken to a hospital following the incident but stayed behind at a Pittsburgh hotel for the night before returning to Boston the following day. Savard recovered enough to be cleared to play for the 2010 playoff series against the Philadelphia Flyers after their victory against the Buffalo Sabres. He scored the winning goal in overtime in the Bruins' win in Game 1 of the series.

Savard was diagnosed with post-concussion syndrome during the subsequent off-season, missing the first 23 games of the 2010–11 season. Despite eventually returning, Savard's performance was quite muted, with just 10 points in 25 games after scoring at a near point-per-game basis for most of his career with the Bruins. On January 23, 2011, Savard suffered a second concussion on a hit by former Bruin Matt Hunwick in a game against the Colorado Avalanche. On February 8, 2011, the Bruins opted to shut Savard down for the season after he received his second concussion in ten months. The Bruins went on to win the Stanley Cup, defeating the Vancouver Canucks in seven games. Due to recurring symptoms of post-concussion syndrome, Savard was not able to travel to Vancouver to take part in the on-ice victory celebration with his teammates, but he was able to join them back in Boston for the official victory parade.

Despite his not having played the required number of games for his name to be automatically included in the Stanley Cup engraving, the Bruins petitioned the league to include Savard's name on the Cup. Savard enjoyed his personal day with the Stanley Cup on August 1, 2011, in his hometown of Peterborough, Ontario; at that time, he announced he was still suffering the effects of his injury. On August 31, 2011, it was announced Savard had been shut down for the 2011–12 season by Bruins general manager Peter Chiarelli. Chiarelli was quoted as saying, "Based on what I see, what I hear, what I read, and what I'm told, it's very unlikely Marc will play again." On September 12, 2011, Chiarelli announced Savard's name would be included on the Stanley Cup as he had missed games only due to injury.

On July 1, 2015, Savard's contract with the Bruins was included in a trade of Reilly Smith to the Florida Panthers in exchange for Jimmy Hayes due to salary cap circumstances.

On June 10, 2016, Savard's contract was traded to the New Jersey Devils, along with a second-round pick in the 2018 NHL Entry Draft, in exchange for Paul Thompson and Graham Black. Savard formally announced his retirement on January 22, 2018, seven years after he played his last NHL game.

Awards
 Won the Eddie Powers Memorial Trophy (OHL top scorer) in 1995 and 1997.
 Won the CHL Top Scorer Award in 1995.
 Named the NHL Offensive Player of the Week for October 5–8, 2005.
 Elizabeth C. Dufresne Trophy winner in 2007 and 2009.
 Bruins Three Stars Awards — 2007, 2008 and 2009.
 Played in the NHL All-Star Game in 2008 and 2009.
 Won the Stanley Cup in 2011.

Records
 Oshawa Generals franchise all-time points leader – 413 points in 238 games (1993–94 to 1996–97)
 Atlanta Thrashers franchise record for most assists in consecutive games – 7 in 2 games (November 11–12, 2005)

Career statistics

Golf career 
During the 2007 offseason, Savard qualified for the 2007 Royal Canadian Golf Association's Canadian Men's Mid-Amateur Golf Championship.

References

External links
 

1977 births
Living people
Atlanta Thrashers players
Boston Bruins players
Calgary Flames players
Canadian ice hockey centres
Franco-Ontarian people
Hartford Wolf Pack players
Ice hockey people from Ottawa
National Hockey League All-Stars
New York Rangers draft picks
New York Rangers players
Oshawa Generals players
SC Bern players
Stanley Cup champions
Canadian expatriate ice hockey players in Switzerland